LACA may refer to:

 Los Angeles, California, the second most populous city in the US
 lacA, a structural gene in the lac operon
 Latin America and Central America, a designation used by American businesses doing business globally
 Luxembourg Approach Controllers Association, the official representation of approach controllers in Luxembourg
 Alexandre Lacazette (born 1991), nickname for the French footballer who plays for Arsenal.
 Laca, south-eastern mountainside Barangay of Municipality of Jagna, Bohol, Philippines